Terry Day (born 1953) is a former professional rugby league footballer who played in the 1970s and 1980s.

Playing career
Terry Day made his début for Wakefield Trinity during September 1980, and he played his last match for Wakefield Trinity during the 1981–82 season, he was signed by Warrington from Hull F.C. on a season-long loan for the 1983–84 season, he made his début for Warrington on Wednesday 21 September 1983, and he played his last match for Warrington on Sunday 4 December 1983.

Championship final appearances
Terry Day played , i.e. number 5, in Dewsbury's 22–13 victory over Leeds in the Championship Final during the 1972–73 season at Odsal Stadium, Bradford on Saturday 19 May 1973.

Challenge Cup Final appearances
Terry Day played right-, i.e. number 3 (James Leuluai played right- in the replay), in Hull FC's 14–14 draw with Widnes in the 1981–82 Challenge Cup Final during the 1981–82 season at Wembley Stadium, London on Saturday 1 May 1982, in front of a crowd of 92,147, and played as an interchange/substitute, i.e. number 14, (replacing  Kevin Harkin) in the 12–14 defeat by Featherstone Rovers in the 1982–83 Challenge Cup Final during the 1982–83 season at Wembley Stadium, London on Saturday 7 May 1983, in front of a crowd of 84,969.

County Cup Final appearances
Terry Day played left-, i.e. number 4, in Dewsbury's 9-36 defeat by Leeds in the 1972–73 Yorkshire County Cup Final during the 1972–73 season at Odsal Stadium, Bradford on Saturday 7 October 1972, in front of a crowd of 7,806, played right-, i.e. number 3, (replaced by interchange/substitute, i.e. number 14, John Crossley Jr.) in York's 8-18 defeat by Bradford Northern in the 1978–79 Yorkshire County Cup Final during the 1978–79 season at Headingley Rugby Stadium, Leeds on Saturday 28 October 1978, in front of a crowd of 10,429, and played right- in Hull FC's 18–7 victory over Bradford Northern in the 1982–83 Yorkshire County Cup Final during the 1982–83 season at Elland Road, Leeds on Saturday 2 October 1982, in front of a crowd of 11,755.

John Player Trophy Final appearances
Terry Day played  in Hull FC's 12–4 victory over Hull Kingston Rovers in the 1981–82 John Player Trophy Final during the 1981–82 season at Headingley Rugby Stadium, Leeds on Saturday 23 January 1982, in front of a crowd of 25,245.

References

External links
2nd April 1983: Hull 14 Castleford 7 (RL Cup semi-final-at Elland Road)
Forty years on, the glory is still fresh

1953 births
Living people
Dewsbury Rams players
English rugby league players
Hull F.C. players
Rugby league centres
Rugby league five-eighths
Rugby league players from Pontefract
Rugby league wingers
Wakefield Trinity captains
Wakefield Trinity players
Warrington Wolves players
York Wasps players
Yorkshire rugby league team players